Bolkiah Garrison also sometimes referred to as Bolkiah Camp, is one of the military bases in Mukim Berakas 'A', Bandar Seri Begawan, and serves as the headquarters of the Ministry of Defence (MINDEF) and Royal Brunei Armed Forces (RBAF). International defence collaborations, meetings and bilateral exercises are planned and considered within this military base.

History
The Training Institute of the Royal Brunei Armed Forces (TI RBAF) was established on 7 April 1969, but it would later be relocated to Penanjong Garrison in 1991. At the Bolkiah Garrison, the Second Battalion was organized on 2 January 1975, and temporarily based there until the completion of the Tutong Camp in Tutong town, Tutong District on 10 May 1976. As of 1995, there was a small garrison based at Bolkiah Camp alongside British commanding officers to provide training the local soldiers. 

In 2008, plans were made to upgrade the base's surau, RBAF Museum and provide housing for the inhabitants. The Medical Reception Station (MRS) designed ALD Consultants was officially opened in 2018. On 21 March 2019, at the newly built Bolkiah Gymnasium and Multi-Purpose Hall, the Royal Brunei Armed Forces (RBAF) hosted the launching ceremony for "the Upgrading of the RBAF's Identification Card and Security Enhancement Expo in upholding Wawasan Brunei 2035." One of the attempts to strengthen the security system in the RBAF is the upgrading of the identification card. During Royal Brunei Armed Forces’s (RBAF) 58th anniversary on 30 June 2019, 1,058 servicemen participated in an annual parade held within the Bolkiah Garrison.

Facilities 
There are several facilities built within the base:

 Royal Brunei Armed Forces Museum
 Medical Reception Station
 Ministry of Defence Building
 Bolkiah Gymnasium and Multi-Purpose Hall
 Performance Optimisation Centre
 Dewan Gerak Badan
 Officer's Mess
 Surau Ad Difa' Bolkiah Garison
 Joint Force Headquarters
 Sultan Haji Hassanal Bolkiah Institute of Defence & Strategic Studies Library Bolkiah Garrison

References

External links

Royal Brunei Land Forces
Bandar Seri Begawan